A Country Wedding is a 2015 American-Canadian made-for-television romantic drama film directed by Anne Wheeler and starring Jesse Metcalfe, Autumn Reeser, and Lauren Holly. It premiered on Hallmark Channel on June 27, 2015.

Plot
A few weeks before his very glamorous wedding to a famous actress, a country music singer returns to the small town in Texas where he grew up to sell his family's old house. There, he meets his childhood friend, Sarah, a cowgirl who owns a small ranch. With her, he rediscovers the joy of the simple things in life that he had forgotten.

Cast

References

External links

2015 television films
2015 films
2015 romantic drama films
American romantic drama films
Hallmark Channel original films
Canadian romantic drama films
English-language Canadian films
Films directed by Anne Wheeler
Films shot in British Columbia
American drama television films
2010s English-language films
2010s American films
2010s Canadian films